The Locus Award for Best Horror Novel is a literary award given annually by Locus Magazine as part of their Locus Awards. It has also been known as both the Locus Award for Best Horror/Dark Fantasy Novel and Locus Award for Best Dark Fantasy/Horror Novel.

Naming
 Locus Award for Best Horror Novel (1989–90, 1994, since 2017)
 Locus Award for Best Horror/Dark Fantasy Novel (1991–93, 1996–97)
 Locus Award for Best Dark Fantasy/Horror Novel (1995, 1999)

Winners
Full list of category winners at sfadb.

Original run (1989–1999)

Current run (2017–Present)

References

Lists of award winners
Horror
Horror fiction awards